The Khartoum process is an inter-regional forum on migration covering the Horn of Africa and Europe. Its members are the African Union Commission and the European Commission.

Description 
The Khartoum process is an inter-regional forum that includes the African Union Commission and the European Commission. The remit  of the forum covers migration from the Horn of Africa and Europe.

Stakeholder concerns 
Although the partners' stated intention was to "establish an effective, humanitarian and safe European migration policy", the Khartoum process has been criticised by scholars, by the United Kingdom's cross-party International Development Committee, and by observers in Sudan, for undermining European human rights commitments. Concerns have focused especially on European Union (EU) funding being used to support the capture, detention, and in some cases torture, of refugees and other migrants by Libyan and Sudanese authorities.

See also
 Malta Declaration (European Union)
 Valletta Summit on Migration
 Prague Process (co-operation in migration management)

References

Human rights
Immigration to the European Union
African Union Commission
Organisations associated with the European Commission
European Union and third organisations